William Beckwith McInnes (18 May 1889 – 9 November 1939) was an Australian portrait painter, winner of the Archibald Prize seven times for his traditional style paintings. He was acting-director at the National Gallery of Victoria and an instructor in its art school.

Early life
McInnes was born in St Kilda, a suburb of Melbourne, to Malcolm McInnes and his wife Alice Agnes, née Beckwith. Despite lack of family artistic tradition, he was keen to draw from the time he could hold a pencil. In 1903, at 14 years of age, he enrolled in the drawing school of the National Gallery of Victoria under Frederick McCubbin. Later he moved up to the painting school under Lindsay Bernard Hall.

Artistic career
He won his first prizes for drawing the figure from life, and for painting a head from life, and shared the prize for a landscape in 1908.

Soon afterwards McInnes held a successful show of his paintings at the Melbourne Athenaeum Gallery in conjunction with F. R. Crozier, which was followed in 1911 by a journey to Europe where he did much landscape painting and made acquaintance with the masterpieces of Rembrandt, Velasquez and Raeburn.

McInnes was represented in London at the exhibition of the Royal Institute of Painters in oils in 1913.

He returned to Melbourne in the same year, where a one-man show was held at the Athenaeum gallery and nearly everything was sold. In 1916 he acted as locum tenens for Frederick McCubbin, master of the school of drawing at the National Gallery of Victoria, during McCubbin's six months' leave of absence.  McInnes was temporarily appointed to the position in 1918 after McCubbin's death, and in 1920 he was permanently appointed.

In 1921, he won the first Archibald Prizes for portraiture. He went on to win the award a total of seven times.

McInnes revisited Europe in 1925 and found he was in great demand as a portrait painter. For many years he was unable to spare time to do landscape work.  In 1927 he was commissioned by the Federal government to depict the opening of the first parliament in Canberra by the Duke of York. In 1928 he exhibited with the Royal Academy, and in 1933 he visited England again to paint the Duke of York (later King George VI).

In the following year when Bernard Hall left for England as adviser for the Felton bequest, McInnes was appointed acting-director of the National Gallery of Victoria, and on Hall's death, was appointed head of the painting school. In 1937 McInnes became an invited foundation member of, and exhibited with, Robert Menzies' anti-modernist organisation, the Australian Academy of Art.

Amongst the many portraits by McInnes were those of the surgeons Archibald Watson and Wood Jones.

McInnes' artwork is featured at the Art Gallery of South Australia and the Art Gallery of NSW. In addition, McInnes has painted a variety of important people in Australian history including officials and aristocratic families.

Late life
McInnes suffered from an imperfect heart all his life.  On 30 November 1937 around midnight the car he was driving struck and killed a pedestrian, James Lowrey, on Brunswick Street in Fitzroy. At the inquest evidence was brought forward that a drug (Luminal) he was taking for the condition could have affected his driving and been responsible for his staggering and not remembering details of the accident. He was not convicted of any offence.

His general health became affected and in July 1939 he resigned his position as master of the National Gallery art school. He died on 9 November 1939. He married Violet Muriel Musgrave in 1915, a capable flower painter, who survived him with four sons and two daughters.

McInnes' Archibald Prize winners
 1921 - Desbrowe Annear
 1922 - Professor Harrison Moore
 1923 - Portrait of a Lady
 1924 - Miss Collins
 1926 - Silk and Lace (Miss Esther Paterson)
 1930 - Drum-Major Harry McClelland
 1936 - Dr. Julian Smith

McInnes also won the Wynne Prize in 1918 with The Grey Road.

References

Sources

External links

Example of his work

1889 births
1939 deaths
Australian portrait painters
Archibald Prize winners
Archibald Prize finalists
Wynne Prize winners
20th-century Australian painters
20th-century Australian male artists
Australian male painters
People from St Kilda, Victoria
Artists from Melbourne
National Gallery of Victoria Art School alumni